The Misema River is a river in Timiskaming District and Cochrane District in Northeastern Ontario, Canada. It is in the Saint Lawrence River drainage basin and is a left tributary of the Blanche River.

Course
The river begins at Sullivan Lake in geographic Ben Nevis Township, Cochrane District. It exits the lake at the northeast and travels counterclockwise around the Pushkin Hills, part of the Blake River Megacaldera Complex, eventually heading south into Timiskaming District and Misema Lake, where it takes in the left tributary Little Misema River in geographic Katrine Township. It heads south, passes under the former National Transcontinental Railway main line transcontinental railroad and Ontario Highway 66, flows over the Eighty Foot Falls, site of Canadian Hydro Developers' Misema Dam and 3.2 MW hydroelectric powerplant, and reaches its mouth at the Blanche River in Marter Township on the border with Chamberlain to the west. The Blanche River flows via the Ottawa River to the Saint Lawrence River.

Tributaries
Spring Creek (left)
McElroy Creek (right)
Estrangement Creek (left)
Victoria Creek (right)
Kinabik Creek (left)
Little Misema River (left)

See also
List of rivers of Ontario

References

Sources

Rivers of Timiskaming District
Rivers of Cochrane District